Andrew Kendall-Moullin (born November 30, 1994) is an American soccer player who currently plays as a defender.

Career

College
Kendall-Moullin played four years of college soccer at Southern Illinois University Edwardsville, where he made 72 appearances, scored 3 goals and tallied 8 assists. While at college, Kendall-Moullin also played with Premier Development League sides Reading United AC and Lehigh Valley United.

Professional career
Kendall-Moullin signed with San Antonio FC in October 2017. He made his debut on October 11, 2017 against Portland Timbers 2, coming off at half-time.

On February 18, 2018, Kendall-Moullin signed with expansion side Atlanta United 2.

Kendall-Moullin joined USL League One expansion side Chattanooga Red Wolves SC on January 14, 2019.

Kendall-Moulin moved to Germany in 2020 to join TuS Ennepetal 1911.

References

External links 
 

1994 births
Living people
Association football defenders
American soccer players
Soccer players from Minnesota
SIU Edwardsville Cougars men's soccer players
Lehigh Valley United players
People from Faribault, Minnesota
Reading United A.C. players
San Antonio FC players
Atlanta United 2 players
Chattanooga Red Wolves SC players
USL Championship players
USL League One players
USL League Two players